The Angolan epauletted fruit bat (Epomophorus angolensis) is a species of megabat in the family Pteropodidae. It is found in Angola and Namibia. Its natural habitat is savanna.

Taxonomy and etymology
It was described as a new species in 1870 by British zoologist John Edward Gray. Gray described it as a "variety" of Epomophorus macrocephalus, which has since been synonymized with the Angolan epauletted fruit bat. Its species name "angolensis" is Latin for "Angolan."

Range and status 
It is found only in Angola and Namibia. It is generally found in low-lying areas, though its range may include some montane habitats as well. As of 2016, it was evaluated as a near-threatened species by the IUCN.

Sources

Epomophorus
Taxonomy articles created by Polbot
Bats of Africa
Mammals described in 1870
Taxa named by John Edward Gray